Claude Maurice "Turk" McBride (born May 30, 1985) is a former American football defensive end who played in the National Football League. He was drafted by the Kansas City Chiefs in the second round of the 2007 NFL Draft. He played college football at Tennessee.

He also played for the Detroit Lions, New Orleans Saints and Chicago Bears.

Early years
McBride attended Woodrow Wilson High School in Camden, New Jersey, where he played football for his uncle, Mike McBride and graduated in 2003. He was a four-year starter at wide receiver and a 2-year starter at defensive end.  Following his senior season, McBride was named an All-American by Parade and SuperPrep.  McBride also was named All-State, All-Area, All-Group 3, All-Conference and All-South for his respective areas.  He set the school record for sacks in his senior year at Woodrow Wilson.

College career
McBride divided his time between the defensive tackle and defensive end position at Tennessee.  He started four games his sophomore season and the entire season his senior year.  He was named the SEC defensive lineman of the week once in 2004 and once in 2006.  Following the 2006 season, McBride was named to the Sporting News All SEC team.

Professional career

Pre-draft

Kansas City Chiefs
McBride was drafted by the Kansas City Chiefs in the 2007 NFL Draft in the second round with the 54th overall pick. He signed a three-year contract with the team  on July 24, 2007. He was featured in HBO's Hard Knocks in 2007. He spent most of the 2008 season on injured reserve. The Chiefs waived McBride on September 15, 2009.

Detroit Lions
McBride was claimed off waivers by the Detroit Lions in September 2009.

New Orleans Saints
After the 2010 season, he became a free agent and on July 31, 2011, he signed with the New Orleans Saints.

Chicago Bears
On March 20, 2013, he signed a one-year deal with the Chicago Bears. On July 29, 2013, McBride suffered a ruptured Achilles tendon during training camp and was out for the entire 2013 season. He was released with an injury settlement on July 31.

References

External links
Chicago Bears bio
Detroit Lions bio
Tennessee Volunteers bio

1985 births
Living people
Players of American football from Camden, New Jersey
Woodrow Wilson High School (New Jersey) alumni
American football linebackers
American football defensive ends
Tennessee Volunteers football players
Kansas City Chiefs players
Detroit Lions players
New Orleans Saints players
Chicago Bears players